Scott Nicolay (born April 16, 1963) is an American author of weird fiction.  Nicolay's "Do You Like to Look At Monsters?"  received the World Fantasy Award for Best Short Story in 2015. He resides on the Navajo Nation in New Mexico.  Nicolay hosts The Outer Dark, a weekly podcast about weird fiction.

Biography
Nicolay was born in New Jersey and studied at Rutgers University.

At the age of 26, he moved to the Navajo Nation in New Mexico, where he later taught school. Nicolay is a poetry enthusiast and has translated poetry and fiction from French.  He has been active in youth poetry slam movements.

Nicolay spent time as an active caver and archaeologist.  He used the name Ana Kai Tangata, a cave he had studied on Easter Island, for the title of his first book of collected short fiction. The cave's name is associated with cannibalism in the Rapa Nui language.

Selected bibliography
 Ana Kai Tangata (2014), collected short fiction.
 "Do You Like to Look at Monsters?" (2015), short story, recipient of the World Fantasy Award for Best Short Story.
 After (2015), novella.

References

External links
 
 Biography
 Bibliography
 The Outer Dark podcast

1963 births
American horror writers
Rutgers University alumni
Living people
World Fantasy Award-winning writers
Weird fiction writers